Ralf Baumeister (born September 1, 1961 in Schwabach) is a German professor (Bioinformatics and Molecular Genetics).
 
He is currently co-director of the School of Life Sciences at Freiburg University's Institute of Advanced Studies.
He uses the model organism Caenorhabditis elegans in his studies.

External links
 
 

1961 births
Living people
21st-century German biologists
Academic staff of the University of Freiburg
People from Schwabach